The 2018 Gander Outdoors 150 was the 14th stock car race of the 2018 NASCAR Camping World Truck Series season and the 9th iteration of the event. The race was held on Saturday, July 28. 2018, in Long Pond, Pennsylvania at Pocono Raceway, a 2.5 miles (4.0 km) triangular permanent course. The race took the scheduled 60 laps to complete. At race's end, Kyle Busch driving for his own team Kyle Busch Motorsports would dominate and win his 51st NASCAR Camping World Truck Series career win and his second of the season. To fill out the podium, Erik Jones of Kyle Busch Motorsports and Dalton Sargeant of GMS Racing would finish second and third, respectively.

Background

Entry list 

*Driver changed to Erik Jones due to Gragson suffering from a stomach virus from which NASCAR did not medically clear Gragson to race.

Practice

First and final practice 
Originally, two sessions were meant to be held during the weekend. While the first session had started, only 15 minutes were run until heavy lightning forced the cancellation of the first practice. Any drivers who set a time within the first 15 minutes would have their times transfer over to the second practice.

The only practice session of the weekend would take place on Friday, July 27, at 2:00 PM EST.

Qualifying 
Qualifying would take place on Saturday, July 28, at 10:00 AM EST.  Since Pocono Raceway is at least a 1.5 miles (2.4 km) racetrack, the qualifying system was a single car, single lap, two round system where in the first round, everyone would set a time to determine positions 13-32. Then, the fastest 12 qualifiers would move on to the second round to determine positions 1-12.

No drivers would fail to qualify.

Full qualifying results

Race results 
Stage 1 Laps: 15

Stage 2 Laps: 15

Stage 3 Laps: 30

References 

2018 NASCAR Camping World Truck Series
NASCAR races at Pocono Raceway
July 2018 sports events in the United States
2018 in sports in Pennsylvania